Kaluzhskaya was a temporary station of the Moscow Metro on the Kaluzhsko-Rizhskaya Line and was in operation from 1964 to 1974. It was housed in the then easternmost bay of the Kaluzhskaya Depot in southwestern Moscow and was replaced by the current Kaluzhskaya station which was opened in 1974. It is one of two abandoned stations on the Moscow Metro (the other one being the old Pervomayskaya station). The depot building was later expanded eastward; one of the former platform tracks has been removed, the other houses trains at night, and the platform is used as a storage room.

Moscow Metro stations
Railway stations in Russia opened in 1964
Railway stations closed in 1974
1964 establishments in the Soviet Union
1974 disestablishments in the Soviet Union
Kaluzhsko-Rizhskaya Line